Conger may refer to any one of the following:

Conger, some species of marine eel
Conger (syndicate), a type of business syndicate
In the southeast USA, the Amphiuma (a genus of aquatic salamanders)
USS Conger (SS-477), a U. S. submarine
A rocket-propelled mine-clearing line charge used by the British Army in 1944-45.

Places
Conger, Minnesota
Conger Glacier, Antarctica
Conger Range, Nunavut, Canada
Congers, New York
Congerville, Illinois
Fort Conger, Nunavut, Canada
Conger Sound, North Greenland

People
Abraham Benjamin Conger (1887–1953), American federal judge in the state of Georgia
Arthur L. Conger (1872–1951), American theosophist
Benn Conger (1856–1922), American businessman, banker and politician
Darva Conger (born 1965), American reality show contestant
Dick Conger (1921–1970), American major league baseball pitcher
Edward Augustus Conger (1882–1963), American federal judge in New York City
Edwin H. Conger (1843–1907), American Civil War soldier, lawyer, banker, Iowa congressman, and diplomat
Everton Conger (1834–1918) American Civil War officer, helped capture assassin John Wilkes Booth
Hank Conger (born 1988), American major league baseball player
Harmon S. Conger (1816–1882) American politician, House Representative for the state of New York
Jack E. Conger (1921–2006), American Marine fighter pilot, Navy Cross recipient
James L. Conger (1805–1876) American politician, House Representative for the state of Michigan
Lauri Conger (born ?), Canadian keyboardist and songwriter
Omar D. Conger (1818–1898) American politician, House Representative and Senator for the state of Michigan
Paul S. Conger (1897–1979), American diatomist and planktonologist
Rand Conger (born 1941), American psychologist
Wilson Seymour Conger (1804–1864), Canadian merchant, railway executive, and politician

See also
Conga (disambiguation)
Konga
Kongo, Congo (disambiguation)
Conga line, a dance
Konger, a Polish performance art group from Kraków, Poland